Ha Yeon-Joo (born August 6, 1987) is a  South Korean actress. She is also a member of Mensa International.

Personal life 
Ha prepared to marry a non-celebrity boyfriend. They are scheduled to marry on June 20, 2021.

Filmography

Television series

Films

Variety shows

References

External links
Ha Yeon-joo at Huayi Brothers 
 

1987 births
Living people
South Korean television actresses
South Korean film actresses
South Korean television personalities
People from Seoul
Mensans